

Belgium 

 Antwerpen (1547–1873, precedent)
 Weigh house of Kortrijk (?)

Estonia 
 Weigh house of Narva (1741–1944)

France 
 Poids du Roi La Rochelle (?)
 Poids public Buzet-sur-Tarn
 Poids public La Chpelle Grésignac in Dordogne

Germany 

Weigh house in Berlin (1831, part of the new storage yard called "Packhof")
Weigh house of Brakel (around 1350)
Old weigh house of Braunschweig (1534-1944, 1994)
Weigh house of Bremen (1588)
Weigh house of Frankfurt on the Main (1503-1944)
Weigh house of Görlitz (1600)
 Weigh house of Halle/Saale (1581)
Weigh house of Hamburg (1672–1842)
Weigh house of Kempten (?)
Weigh house of Leer (1714)
Weigh house of Leipzig (1555)
Weigh house of Lübeck (1444, annex town hall called "Kriegsstubenbau")
Weigh house of Osnabrück (1532)
Weigh house of Ravensburg (1556)
Weigh house of Stade (1753)
 Weigh house of Stralsund (13. or 14. c.)
 Harbour weigh house in Stralsund (13. or 14. c.)

Great Britan 
Weigh house of Edinburgh (1352–1820, ?)
Custom house of London (1718)

Ireland 
 Gort (Mid mid- to late 18th c.)
Scariff, County Clare.

Italy 

Weigh house of Bolzano (14. c.)
Dogana of Florence (1495, annex to the Palazzo Vecchio)
Dogana di San Fermo in Verona (1746
Dogana Terra in Venice (after 1513, Palazzo dei Dieci Savi);

Netherlands 

 Weigh house of Alkmaar (1582, originally a Holy Spirit Hospital)
 Weigh house of Amersfoort (1622–1865)
 Weigh house of Amsterdam (1565–1808, precedent)
 Weigh house of Amsterdam (1620–1857 on the Westermarket)
 St. Antonies Weigh house in Amsterdam (1488, city gate called "St. Antoniespoort")
 Amsterdam (1655, city gate called "Regulierspoort")
 Weigh house of Arnhem (1761, tower type)
 Weigh house of Bergen op Zoom (1751)
 Weigh house of Breda (1659–1865)
 Weigh house of Brielle (1623)
 Weigh house of Brouwershaven (1646)
 Weigh house of Buren (1612)
 Weigh house of Delfshaven (?)
 Weigh house of Delft (16th century)
 Weigh house of Den Haag (after 1650)
 Weigh house of Deventer (1528)
 Weigh house of Doesburg (around 15th century)
 Weigh house for iron in Dordrecht (1325)
 Weigh house of Dokkum (1593)
 Weigh house of Dordrecht (1360)
 Weigh house of Edam (1778)
 Weigh house of Elburg (?–1854), city gate called "Goor gate")
 Weigh house of Enkhuizen (1559, dwelling).
 Weigh house of Franeker (1657, drive through type)
 Weigh house of Gouda (1668, synthesis type)
 Weigh house of Groenlo (16th century)
 Weigh house of Groningen (1660–1874, drive through type)
 Weigh house of Haarlem (1598, tower type)
 Weigh house of Hattem (1621)
 Weigh house of Hoorn (1609, loggia type)
 Weigh house of Ijsselstein (1779)
 Weigh house of Kampem (?, city gate called "Veene gate")
 Weigh house of Leeuwarden (1598, drive through type)
 Weigh house of Leiden (1658, synthesis type)
 Weigh house of Lochem (after 1640)
 Weigh house for wool in Maastricht (1721)
 Weigh house of Makkum (1698, tower type)
 Weigh house of Medemblik (17th century)
 Weigh house of Meppel (1617)
 Weigh house of Middelburg (1523)
 Weigh house of Monnickendam (1669, loggia type)
 Weigh house of Montfoort (1615 – 20th century)
 Weigh house of Nieuwpoort (1697)
 Weigh house of Nijmegen (1612)
 Weigh house of Oudewater (1595)
 Weigh house of Schiedam (1572)
 Weigh house of Schoonhoven (1617)
 Weigh house of Purmerend (1744–1883)
 Weigh house of Rhenen (1738–1960s)
 Weigh house of Rotterdam (1703–1827, loggia type)
 Weigh house for butter in Rotterdam (1619)
 Weigh house of Sneek (17th century)
 Weigh house of Steenwijk (1642)
 Weigh house of Utrecht (1410)
 Weigh house of Vianen (17th century)
 Weigh house of Vlaardingen (around 1609)
 Weigh house of Workum (1650, drive through type)
 Weigh house of Zaltbommel (1798)

Poland 
 Weigh house of Krakow (second half of the 14th century – ca.1875, "Wielka Waga Miejska")
 Weigh house of Nysa (1606, wooden scale in front of a store house)
 Weigh house of Poznan (1534, annex town hall)
 Weigh house of Wroclaw (small structure in front of the trade hall from 1242)

Suriname 
 Weigh house of Paramaribo (1824)

Switzerland 

 Weigh tower of Schaffhausen (1747, patrician house, called "Fronwaagturm") 
 Weigh house of St. Gallen (1585, trade hall)
 Winterthur (1503)

References

Literature and external link 

 Karl Kiem: Die Waage. Ein Bautyp des »Goldenen Jahrhunderts« in Holland, Berlin 2009. ISBN 978-3-7861-2605-8. (Englisch edition from 2019 Online as PDF available).